Yuzhu Peak, also known as Sob Gangri is a mountain in Qinghai Province, China. It belongs to the eastern part of the Kunlun Mountains (the Bokalyktag mountain range, 博卡雷克塔格山) and its height is 6,178 meters above sea level.

It can be seen from Qingzang Highway or Qingzang Railway, which run north and west of the mountain, and is known to be a mountain of relatively easy access.

See also
 List of Ultras of Tibet, East Asia and neighbouring areas

References

Gallery

Six-thousanders of the Kunlun
Mountains of Qinghai